Albert Frederick Volz (May 12, 1871 – June 5, 1971) was an American businessman and politician.

Volz was born in Arlington Heights, Illinois. He was involved with the foundry manufacturing business in Arlington Heights. He served on the Arlington Heights Board of Trustees and as Mayor of Arlington Heights. Volz also served on the parks and school boards. Volz was a Republican. He served in the Illinois House of Representatives from 1917 to 1923.  Volz died at the Northwestern Community Hospital in Arlington Heights, Illinois.

Notes

External links

1871 births
1971 deaths
People from Arlington Heights, Illinois
American centenarians
Men centenarians
Businesspeople from Illinois
Illinois city council members
Mayors of places in Illinois
School board members in Illinois
Republican Party members of the Illinois House of Representatives